Mohavea confertiflora, the ghost flower, is a plant of the family Plantaginaceae. It is a native of the Southwestern United States, southern California, and three states of northwest Mexico.

It is found growing in the arid conditions of the Mojave Desert and the Sonoran Desert (including Colorado Desert), below  in elevation. It also grows in those deserts' sky islands habitats.

Description

Mohavea confertiflora flowers March to April. This flower, which does not produce nectar, has adapted a morphology resembling the flower Mentzelia involucrata, which often grows in the same habitat. Mentzelia involucrata produces nectar to attract female bees of the genus Xeralictus.

In areas where their ranges overlap, Mohavea confertifolia attracts the same pollinators to its flowers through floral mimicry: Mohavea flowers contain marks that resemble female Xeralictus; these marks operate as a sign stimulus to the male bee, which enters the flower and in doing so pollinates the Mohavea.

References

External links

Jepson Manual Treatment
Photo gallery

Plantaginaceae
Flora of Arizona
Flora of California
Flora of Nevada
Flora of the California desert regions
Flora of the Sonoran Deserts
Flora of Baja California
Flora of Baja California Sur
Flora of Sonora
Natural history of the Colorado Desert
Natural history of the Mojave Desert
Flora without expected TNC conservation status